GBCS may refer to:
 General Board of Church and Society, an agency of the United Methodist Church
 Great British Class Survey, a 2013 UK survey
 Greater Brunswick Charter School, a school in New Jersey

See also 
 GBC (disambiguation)